Xiuhcuetzin was a Queen of Tenochtitlan as a wife of Aztec emperor Acamapichtli. She was a daughter of Ahatl and mother of Prince Quatlecoatl.

See also

List of Tenochtitlan rulers
Huitzilxotzin

Sources

External links 

Tenochca nobility
Queens of Tenochtitlan
Nobility of the Americas